You Must Be the Husband is a British comedy television series starring Tim Brooke-Taylor in the title role of Tom Hammond, and Diane Keen as his wife, Alice Hammond, with Sheila Steafel as Alice's literary agent, Miranda Shaw.

Tom and Alice Hammond are a happily married couple, parents to fraternal twins John and Sarah, who become extremely wealthy when Alice suddenly becomes a best-selling author, much to Tom's surprise and chagrin. The basic plot was based on, and expanded upon, the earlier play "...And I'm The Husband", which Brooke-Taylor and Keen had toured in between 1981 and 1982.

The show ran for two seasons and 13 episodes on the BBC during 1987-1988 and was repeated in the early 1990s on UK Gold, but has never officially been released on DVD, nor in any digital format.

The title song for the show was the Dave Brubeck track, "Take Five".

External links 
 
 

BBC television sitcoms
1987 British television series debuts
1988 British television series endings
1980s British sitcoms
English-language television shows